Fitzmaurice Grammar School was a Grammar School in Bradford on Avon, Wiltshire UK. The school opened as the County School in 1897 with financial support from  Edmond Fitzmaurice, 1st Baron Fitzmaurice. It was renamed Fitzmaurice Grammar School in 1936 after the death of Lord Fitzmaurice. The grammar school was closed in 1980 and merged with Trinity secondary modern school to form the comprehensive school called St Laurence School.

Former pupils
Those educated at the Fitzmaurice Grammar school include:
 Geoffrey Copland  Rector and Vice-Chancellor of the University of Westminster from 1996 to 2007
 Charlotte Long, actress

Grammar School Staff
When the school was closed in 1980, staff included Alistair Thomson, Doug Anderson, John Blake, Liz Buchanan, John Blowers, Noreen Brady, Joan Davis,  Bob Hawkes, Sally Burden, Virginia Evans, Margaret Gadd, Stuart Ferguson, Harry Haddon, Margaret Hore. Tony Hull, Peter Knight,  Marilyn Maundrell, Margaret Osbourne, Lynne Powell,  Sid Johnson, Gerald Reid (Headmaster), Ken Revill, Diane Satterthwaite, Geoff Swift, Meg Tottle-Smith, Joan Van Ryssen, John Warburton, Enid Wicheard and Tim Wilbur.

Fitzmaurice Primary School
A primary school, known since 1985 as the Fitzmaurice Primary School, uses some of the former classrooms of the grammar school.

References

Defunct grammar schools in England
Educational institutions disestablished in 1980
Educational institutions established in 1897
Defunct schools in Wiltshire

1897 establishments in England
1980 disestablishments in England
Bradford-on-Avon